Khukuri Beer is a lager beer with an alcohol strength of 4.7%. The beer was founded in 2003 in a partnership by J.W. Lees Brewery and Mr. Mahanta B. Shrestha a non residential Nepalese restaurateur in London who embarked on a project to deliver a  Nepalese beer in the UK. Since 2007, it is fully owned by Mr. Shrestha. The idea was initiated in order to supply a good demand for Asian beer to blend with south Asian and oriental cuisine.

Placement
Khukuri is beer found in UK, the United States, Finland, Japan, Luxembourg and Portugal.

Award
Khukuri Beer has been awarded the Gold quality award for the year 2012 by the Monde Selection, the world quality award governing body.

See also
Khukri Rum

References

External links
 
 

Beer in England
Nepalese drinks
Alcohol in Nepal